Ahmed Zühdü Pasha (1834 – 1902) was an Ottoman liberal statesman during the First Constitutional Era, who later held the post of Minister of Education.

References 

1834 births
1902 deaths
Politicians from Istanbul
Political people from the Ottoman Empire
Education ministers